"LA Monster" is an unreleased song by American rapper Kanye West. The song was initially intended for West's ninth studio album Jesus Is King (2019) and previewed during listening parties in September and October 2019. West criticized the city of Los Angeles where he lives, saying it is controlled by Satan. The song was leaked online in March 2020 featuring production done by American producer Dr. Dre. "LA Monster" is the second song to leak from Donda, after "Up from the Ashes" leaked online in February 2020.

Background and recording
In August 2019, American rapper Kanye West's wife, American media personality Kim Kardashian, announced that her husband's ninth studio would be titled Jesus Is King. On September 27, 2019, West held a listening party for the album at the Fox Theatre in Detroit, Michigan. Kardashian shared a track list via Twitter that included the track "LA Monster". On September 29, 2019, the listening party in New York City altered the order of the track list, making "LA Monster" the eighth song played out of ten. During the listening party, West announced the song's title as "Ugliest Nightmare". Jesus Is King was released on October 25, 2019. "LA Monster" was not included on the final cut of the album.

On November 18, 2019, West announced on Twitter that he was working with American recording artist Dr. Dre on a sequel collaborative project Jesus Is King Part II. In March 2020, the reworked "LA Monster" for Jesus Is King Part II leaked online. The leaked track was co-produced and mixed by Dr. Dre. Another Jesus Is King Part II track, "Up from the Ashes", had previously leaked online in February 2020.

Composition and lyrics

In the song, West talks about his life and grapples with "the challenges of being in [Los Angeles] and what it can do to you." West, who lives in the suburbs of Los Angeles with Kardashian, raps about the city letting Satan run the streets. West pleads to God to save the people of the city from the "LA Monster", an image of the wild lifestyle of Los Angeles. West criticizes those who claim to be woke, saying that they are sleepwalking and have sold their souls. Brian McCollum of the Detroit Free Press wrote that "LA Monster" continues the overarching spiritual theme of Jesus Is King by warning "against the temptations of superficial culture."

Critical reception
Gary Graff of Billboard described the song as "prayerful". Elias Leight of Rolling Stone reported on gospel artist Donald Lawrence praising the song's narrative as refreshing. Lawrence compared "LA Monster" to gospel songs that have a vertical relationship with God, stating that West talking about his life was "something praise and worship doesn’t allow you to do."

References

2020 songs
Unreleased songs
Kanye West songs
Songs about Los Angeles